is a Japanese speed skater. She competed at the 1968 Winter Olympics and the 1972 Winter Olympics.

References

1947 births
Living people
Japanese female speed skaters
Olympic speed skaters of Japan
Speed skaters at the 1968 Winter Olympics
Speed skaters at the 1972 Winter Olympics
People from Nagano (city)